Iresia mniszechii is a species of tiger beetle of the family Cicindelidae. It is found in French Guiana, Suriname, and Venezuela.

References

Cicindelidae
Beetles described in 1862
Beetles of South America